Gbenga Adeyinka is a multi-award-winning Nigerian actor, comedian, radio and TV presenter, writer, and MC. He hails from Abeokuta in Ogun State and he usually refers to himself as CFR (Comedian of the Federal Republic) and now GCON (Grand Comedian of Nigeria).

Education
Gbenga Adeyinka attended University of Lagos, where he studied English.

Career
Gbenga worked as a corporate affairs manager in the engineering firm. He became popular with his shine shine bobo promo for 'Star Game Show', he has also anchored Television programmes for AIT, Galaxy TV, MBI, and Africa Magic on DSTV. He speaks various Nigerian languages.

Personal life
Gbenga Adeyinka is married to Mrs Abiola Adeyinka, and they have three children.

Professional life
Gbenga has anchored many wedding programmes and events, in and outside Nigeria. He is also the first to publish comedy magazine in Nigeria known as Laffmattazz. He decided to go into farming as he started a new food company Aduni Adeyinka foods in August 2020 during the COVID-19 pandemic.

References 

Nigerian male comedians
Nigerian male film actors
Living people
University of Lagos alumni
1968 births
Actors from Abeokuta
Nigerian radio personalities
Nigerian television personalities
People from Abeokuta
Nigerian writers
Nigerian television presenters
Nigerian radio presenters
21st-century Nigerian male actors
Nigerian media personalities
20th-century Nigerian male actors